Alexander David Ingram (2 January 1945 – 3 February 2022) was a Scottish professional footballer who played as a forward. He spent most of his career at Ayr United and since 2008 was the vice chairman of Ayr United.

Playing career
Ingram owed his nickname 'Dixie' to a character from the White Heather Club. In 1970, Ingram joined English side, Nottingham Forest for a fee of £40,000 after only 28 League games and three goals, he rejoined Ayr United for £15,000.

Ingram is Ayr United's fourth all-time top-scorer, behind Peter Price (213), Sam McMillan (127) and Terry McGibbons (125) on 117 goals in all competitions. He has also maintained a close friendship with Manchester United manager, Sir Alex Ferguson, from his playing days at Somerset Park. In 2008, Ingram was inducted into the Ayr United Hall of Fame.

Career outside football
Ingram founded a motor dealership. He latterly lived with dementia whilst in 24 hour nursing care. He died after a ten-year battle with the illness on 3 February 2022, at the age of 77.

References

External links

1945 births
2022 deaths
Scottish footballers
Ayr United F.C. players
Queen's Park F.C. players
Nottingham Forest F.C. players
Footballers from Edinburgh
Association football forwards
Scottish Football League players
English Football League players
Scottish Football League representative players
Scotland amateur international footballers
Deaths from Alzheimer's disease
Deaths from dementia